Zeta Phi Beta Fraternity of Puerto Rico is a nonprofit fraternal organization that has served the Puerto Rican and Dominican Republic communities for more than 50 years. The group was founded on November 21, 1957 at the University of Puerto Rico at Mayagüez campus by 7 young students from diverse backgrounds. Today, the fraternity has over 3,000 members and 11 chapters at university level, including 2 chapters in the Dominican Republic.

Founding members were:
Luís Manuel Carrillo, Jr.
Oscar Fermaint Giboyeaux
Orlando Clavell Pumarejo
Juan Antonio Martínez
Pedro J. Narváez Negron
Luís Antonio Oliveras Arroyo
Eladio Rivera Rodríguez

Chapters
University Chapters:

 Alpha (A) 1957 -University of Puerto Rico at Mayagüez- Mayaguez Campus
 Beta (B) 1958  - University of Puerto Rico-Rio Piedras Campus, later transferred to University of Puerto Rico at Bayamón
 Gamma (Γ) 1958 -  Interamerican University of Puerto Rico - San German Campus
 Epsilon (Ε) 1960 - Interamerican University of Puerto Rico  - Arecibo Campus
 Eta (Η) 1962 - Interamerican University of Puerto Rico – Hato Rey Campus
 Delta (Δ) 1963 - Pontifical Catholic University of Puerto Rico - Ponce Campus
 Sigma (Σ) 1965 - Interamerican University of Puerto Rico- Ponce Campus
 Omicron (Õ) 1968 - Pedro Henríquez Ureña National University - Dominican Republic
 Omega (Ω) 1984 - Polytechnic University of Puerto Rico - Hato Rey Campus
 Tau (T) 1997 - University of Puerto Rico – Utuado Campus
 Lambda (Λ) 2008 - Universidad Central del Este- Dominican Republic

References

Fraternities and sororities in Puerto Rico
Latino fraternities and sororities
Student organizations established in 1957
1957 establishments in Puerto Rico